Presser v. Illinois, 116 U.S. 252 (1886), was a landmark decision of the Supreme Court of the United States that held, "Unless restrained by their own constitutions, state legislatures may enact statutes to control and regulate all organizations, drilling, and parading of military bodies and associations except those which are authorized by the militia laws of the United States." It states that the Second Amendment to the United States Constitution limited only the power of Congress and the national government to control firearms, not that of the states, and that the right to peaceably assemble in the First Amendment to the United States Constitution was not protected by the clause referred to except to petition the government for a redress of grievances. This decision was overruled in McDonald v. City of Chicago in (2010).

Background
In this 1886 case, Herman Presser was part of a citizen militia group, the Lehr und Wehr Verein (Instruct and Defend Association), a group of armed ethnic German workers, associated with the Socialist Labor Party. The group had been formed to counter the armed private armies of companies in Chicago.  Basically, Presser,  Presser claimed the law violated his rights under the Second Amendment.

Decision 
In Presser v. Illinois, the Supreme Court stated:

In Presser, the Court reaffirmed its 1876 decision in Cruikshank that the Second Amendment acts as a limitation upon only the federal government and not the states. Cruikshank and Presser are consistently used by the lower courts to deny any recognition of individual rights claims and provides justification to state and local municipalities to pass laws that regulate guns.

However, the Court stated that there is a limit upon state restriction of firearms ownership in that they may not disarm the people to such an extent that there is no remaining armed militia force for the general government to call upon:

The Court emphatically disposed of Presser's argument that there exists a right to assemble, drill, or march in a militia independent of authorization by state or federal law:

Analysis 
The traditional reading of Presser is that it affirms the states' rights view articulated in Cruikshank. Modern supporters of the individual rights view have challenged this claim, viewing the case as affirming a right to keep and bear arms as a necessary condition to have a universal militia. The conflict between the viewpoints was argued in court in 1982 in the case of Quilici v. Village of Morton Grove in which the United States Court of Appeals for the Seventh Circuit held:

See also
United States v. Cruikshank, 
District of Columbia v. Heller
Nordyke v. King
McDonald v. Chicago

References

Further reading

External links

History of Chicago
Incorporation case law
Socialist Labor Party of America
United States Freedom of Assembly Clause case law
United States Second Amendment case law
United States Supreme Court cases
United States Supreme Court cases of the Waite Court
1886 in United States case law